Agutaya, officially the Municipality of Agutaya,  is a 5th class municipality in the province of Palawan, Philippines. According to the 2020 census, it has a population of 12,867 people.

An island municipality, it is the eastern part of the Cuyo Archipelago in the Sulu Sea, and the municipality covers several islands, including its namesake Agutaya Island, which is the second largest island of the Cuyo archipelago, as well as Diit, Halog, Maracanao, Matarawis (also spelled Matarabis), Eke, and Quiniluban islands.

Geography

The north-eastern part is hilly. Four peaks tower over the island.

Native sailboats used to be unable to sail to and from the nearby island of Cuyo (only 20 miles away), due to the strength of the monsoon, either the Northwest monsoon in wintertime, or the Southwest monsoon in summer.

Volcano

Philippine Institute of Volcanology and Seismology (Phivolcs) lists Agutaya as inactive.

Barangays
The Municipality of Agutaya is politically subdivided into 10 barangays.

 Abagat (Poblacion)
 Algeciras
 Bangcal (Poblacion)
 Cambian (Poblacion)
 Concepcion
 Diit
 Maracañao
 Matarawis
 Villa Fria
 Villa Sol

Climate

Demographics

Languages
Agutaya is home to a specific language, called the Agutaynen language, spoken by 10,000 people overall. Today, half of its speakers live in Agutaya, while the rest live in other communities of Palawan. Tagalog and Cuyonon are also widely spoken.

Economy

See also
List of inactive volcanoes in the Philippines
 List of islands of the Philippines
List of volcanos in the Philippines
Pacific ring of fire

References

External links

 Agutaya Profile at PhilAtlas.com
 [ Philippine Standard Geographic Code]
Philippine Census Information
Local Governance Performance Management System

Municipalities of Palawan
Islands of Palawan
Volcanoes of Palawan
Inactive volcanoes of the Philippines
Island municipalities in the Philippines